Defending champions Yui Kamiji and Jordanne Whiley defeated Jiske Griffioen and Aniek van Koot in the final, 4–6, 6–4, 7–5 to win the women's doubles wheelchair tennis title at the 2015 Australian Open.

Seeds

Draw

References
Draw

Wheelchair Women's Doubles
2015 Wheelchair Women's Doubles